Liar/Dead Is the New Alive is a 2007 EP by Emilie Autumn, released through Trisol Music Group; the title derives from two tracks taken from her album Opheliac. The release also includes a preview version of the song "Unlaced", which was later released on the Laced/Unlaced album.

Track listing

References

Emilie Autumn albums
2007 EPs